Ozothamnus reflexifolius, commonly known as reflexed everlastingbush, is a flowering plant in the family Asteraceae. It is known from only a single population in the Meehan Range, south-eastern Tasmania. It is thought to be closely related to O. lycopodioides and O. selaginoides.

Description
The inflorescence is cream to yellowish, hemispherical,  diameter, without stalks, grouped in clusters of five to eight at the ends of the branches, and overtopped by the branches arising immediately below the inflorescences. Seeds are highly fecund and germinate readily although have a short period of viability.

Conservation status
Ozothamnus reflexifolius is listed as vulnerable under the Environment Protection and Biodiversity Conservation Act 1999 and the Threatened Species Protection Act 1995 (Tasmania).

Taxonomy and naming
The species was described in 2003 by Kevin E Leeson and Andrew C Rozefelds after discovery in 2000 by Richard Schahinger. O. reflexifolius is named for the reflexed appearance of the adult leaves.

Distribution and habitat
The species is endemic to the Meehan Range, south-eastern Tasmania, occurring on skeletal soils derived from Jurassic dolerite. The population of 4000-5000 mature plants occupy 2 ha within in an area of 4-5 ha. The plants occur as either an understory shrub in Allocasuarina forest, co-dominant in open heath with Spyridium obovatum var. velutinum, or as a component of dolerite rock face vegetation. The restriction of the species to a single population is thought to be a combination of biological attributes, site attributes, and fire disturbance.

References

reflexifolius
Asterales of Australia
Species described in 2003